Kilo is a district of Espoo, a city in Finland. Kilo is a place of homes and small industry. The head police station of Espoo is located in Kilo.

There is a shortage of services in Kilo. For example, to visit the post office or the pharmacist, one would have to go to neighbouring district Leppävaara or the neighbouring municipality of Kauniainen.

See also
 Districts of Espoo
 Ring II

Districts of Espoo